The Battles of Batangas were fought on October 23, 1896, in the towns of Lemery, Bayungyungan, Calaca, and Taal in Batangas province, Philippines. The Katipunan army of Batangas, under General Miguel Malvar, was formed by the elite class in the province. They attempted to destroy Spanish installations in the towns, but failed after the Spanish garrison at Taal, having breaking off the siege earlier in the battle, came in the aid of the besieged towns. The rebels then abandoned their attack and retreated back to the hills, but they managed to save its northern neighbor, the province of Cavite, from recapture by the afterwards much weakened Spanish troops about few weeks later.

Sources 
 Miguel Malvar Museum and Library: Of Battles and Surrender

Battles of the Philippine Revolution
History of Batangas